The love of God is a prevalent concept both in the Old Testament and the New Testament. Love is a key attribute of God in Christianity, even if in the New Testament the expression "God is love" explicitly occurs only twice and in two not too distant verses: 1 John .

The love of God has been the center of the spirituality of a number of Christian mystics such as Teresa of Avila.

Old Testament

The Old Testament uses a rich vocabulary to express the love of God, as a concept that appears in many instances. For example, the prophet Hosea saw God's love as the basis for the election of Israel (cf. Hosea 11:1). In Isaiah 38, God expresses his love for individuals as well. Many Christians see Solomon as symbolizing Christ's relation to his church. The love of God appears in a number of texts (e.g. Hosea 1-3, and then in Ezek 16 and Isa 62, etc.); however, the exegesis of the love of God in the Old Testament has presented problems for modern scholars, especially resolving the references to produce a consistent interpretation has been challenging and subject to debate.

According to Psalms 5, God hates all workers of iniquity:

New Testament

Both the terms love of God and love of Christ appear in the New Testament. In cases such as in Romans 8:35 and Romans 8:39 their use is related in the experience of the believer, without asserting their equality. In John 14:31 Jesus expresses his love for God the Father. This verse includes the only direct statement by Jesus in the New Testament about Jesus' love for the God the Father. The love of the Father for his Son (Jesus Christ) is expressed in Matthew 3:17 by a voice from Heaven during the Baptism of Jesus. The same sentiment is later expressed during the Transfiguration of Jesus in Mark 9:7, where a voice from Heaven tells the three disciples: "This is my Son, whom I love. Listen to him!"

Love is a key attribute of God in Christianity. 1 John 4:8 and 16 state that "God is love; and he who abides in love abides in God, and God abides in him." John 3:16 states: "God so loved the world..."

In the New Testament, God's love for humanity or the world is expressed in Greek as agape. The same Greek word agape is used also of the love of Christians for one another and for other human beings, as in 1 Thessalonians 3:12: "May the Lord make your love increase and overflow for each other and for everyone else." The corresponding verb agapō is used not only of God's love and of the mutual love of Christians, but also of Christians' love for God, as in 1 John 4:21: "And he has given us this command: Whoever loves God must also love his brother."

Christian mysticism
The experience of God's love is a central part of most traditions of Christian mysticism. This experience of God's love plays a central role in the Spiritual Exercises, which are the foundation of Ignatian spirituality. God's love also plays an important part in the writings of Medieval German mystics, such as Mechthild of Magdeburg and Hildegard von Bingen, who describe divine love as a burning passion. Julian of Norwich expresses the same sentiment in her Sixteen Revelations of Divine Love (c. 1393).

Thomas Aquinas taught that the essence of sanctity lies in the love of God, and Thérèse of Lisieux made the love of God the center of her spirituality.

See also

References

External links
 WELS Topical Q&A: God in Old Testament / God in New Testament, by Wisconsin Evangelical Lutheran Synod (Confessional Lutheran perspective)
 God Is Love: His Love in Action

Attributes of God in Christian theology
Christian terminology
Philosophy of love